Charles Mwendwa is an Anglican bishop in Kenya: he has been the Bishop of Meru since 2002.

In 2019 he became the Provincial Dean of the Anglican Church of Kenya.

References

21st-century Anglican bishops of the Anglican Church of Kenya
Anglican bishops of Meru
Year of birth missing (living people)
Living people